Diplomatic ties between Ecuador and Venezuela trace back to the Spanish colonization of the Americas.  With the independence both countries united under the Gran Colombia along with New Granada (then Colombia and Panama).

History 
After the dissolution of the Gran Colombia, Ecuador named Pedro Gual Escandón as plenipotentiary minister with the main task of resolving the debt acquired while part of the Gran Colombia union as well as to establish diplomatic relations with the New Granada and Venezuela. On August 4, 1852 Venezuela sent a diplomatic delegation in Quito and named José Julián Ponce as finance administrator.

The relations remained cordial and entered into a second period between 1910 and 1963 with two diplomatic incidents occurring in 1928 and 1955. Ecuador and Venezuela strengthened ties in politics, diplomacy and military.

Present relations 
Ecuador officially joined the Bolivarian Alliance for the Americas (ALBA), a Venezuelan regional cooperation initiative, in June 2009.

In March 2010 Venezuela and Ecuador announced the creation of a number of bi-national projects and companies. Venezuela and Ecuador had already collaborated on oil and gas projects, and Venezuela had supported the 2007 creation of Ecuador TV.

In July 2018, President Lenín Moreno of Ecuador distanced himself from ALBA, stating that the organization "has not worked for awhile". Relations between Ecuador and Venezuela began to deteriorate after the Ecuadorian government called for the arrest of former Ecuadorian president Rafael Correa. Correa, who was an ally of Venezuela's Bolivarian government and shared the 21st century socialism ideology, was defended by Venezuelan president Nicolás Maduro.

After President Rafael Correa was replaced by Lenin Moreno in 2017, there was a radical turn in the relations with Venezuela. Ecuador broke diplomatic relations with Venezuela. Ecuador did not any more recognize the regime of Nicholas Maduro, former close ally of Correa. Instead, Ecuador recognized and supported Juan Guaidó as Interim President of Venezuela.

References

External links 
  Government of venezuela: Venezuela - Ecuador relations

 
Venezuela 
Bilateral relations of Venezuela